Tret Fure is an American singer-songwriter, prominent in the women's music and folk music scene.

The musical career of Tret Fure has spanned five decades. Fure began her career at the age of 16, singing in coffeehouses and campuses in the Midwest. At 19, she moved to Los Angeles in the hope of obtaining a record deal. Within a year she was performing as guitarist and vocalist for Spencer Davis, touring with him and penning the single for his album "Mousetrap". She went on to record her own album in 1973 on MCA/UNI Records.  With the success of that release, she opened for such bands as Yes, Poco, and the J Geils Band.

A prolific artist in the contemporary singer-songwriter arena, Tret Fure has released 16 albums and CDs over the course of her 49-year career. In addition to being a songwriter, Fure has engineered and produced recordings by a variety of artists, as well as her own work.

In the early 1980s, Fure moved to the independent side of the industry discovering the blossoming genre known as Women's Music. She recorded with and produced some women's music including Meg & Cris at Carnegie Hall (1983). She worked as a duo with Cris Williamson throughout the 1990s, producing, engineering and releasing three CDs together.

Her solo releases include "Tret Fure" (1973), "Terminal Hold" (1984),  "Edges of the Heart" (1986),  "Time Turns the Moon" (1990),  "Back Home" (2001), "My Shoes" (2003), "Anytime Anywhere" (2005) and "True Compass" (2007), "The Horizon" (2010), "A Piece of the Sky" (2013), "Rembrandt Afternoons" (2015), and "Roses in November" (2018).

Awards
In 2004, the National Women's Music Festival honored Fure with the [Jane] Schliessman Award for Outstanding Contribution to Women's Music.

In 2010, Fure received the Pride In The Arts Award for Female/Lesbian Favorite Musician of 2009 by the StoneWall Society.

Discography
Tret Fure has recorded several albums, including:
 Mousetrap (1972, Spencer Davis album)
 Tret Fure (1973)
 Terminal Hold (1984)
 Edges of the Heart (1986)
 Time Turns the Moon (1990)
 Postcards from Paradise (1993, with Cris Williamson)
 Between the Covers (1999, with Cris Williamson)
 Radio Quiet (1999, with Cris Williamson)
 Back Home (2001)
 My Shoes (2002)
 Anytime Anywhere (2005)
 True Compass (2007)
 The Horizon (2010)
 A Piece of the Sky (2013)
 Rembrandt Afternoons (2015)
 Roses in November (2018)
 Stone By Stone (2020)

References

External links
 
 Tret Fure on Reverb Nation
 Tret Fure on Facebook
 Tret Fure on YouTube
  Tret Fure at National Women's Music Festival

1951 births
American folk singers
American women singer-songwriters
American LGBT singers
American LGBT songwriters
Lesbian singers
Lesbian songwriters
American lesbian musicians
Living people
Women's music
LGBT record producers
American women record producers
20th-century American LGBT people
21st-century American LGBT people
20th-century American women singers
20th-century American singers
21st-century American women singers
21st-century American singers
American lesbian writers